Guhe may refer to the following locations in China:

 Guhe, Quanjiao County (古河镇), town in Anhui
 Guhe, Funing County, Jiangsu (古河镇), town
 Guhe, Gaotang County (固河镇), town in Shandong
 Guhe Township, Dahua County (古河乡), in Dahua Yao Autonomous County, Guangxi
 Guhe Township, Laoting County (古河乡), Hebei

See also 
 Guha (disambiguation)